You're Only Young Twice was a British TV sitcom made and broadcast on the ITV network by Yorkshire Television from 6 September 1977 to 4 August 1981.

Plot
Set in Paradise Lodge retirement home, You're Only Young Twice was created and written by the writing partnership of Michael Ashton and Pam Valentine. It starred Peggy Mount as Flora Petty, with Pat Coombs as her sidekick Cissie Lupin. Paradise Lodge was described by Network DVD as "a superior residence for retired gentlefolk".

The majority of the 31 episodes (broadcast throughout the show's four-year run) centre on Flora's attempts to thwart the long-suffering staff, led by Miss Milton (Charmian May). They are occasionally assisted by former theatrical artiste Dolly Love (played by veteran stage actress Lally Bowers) and the haughty Mildred Fanshaw (played by sitcom regular Diana King).

It was produced by Yorkshire Television for the ITV network from 1977 to 1981.

Cast
Peggy Mount as Flora Petty
Pat Coombs as Cissie Lupin
Lally Bowers as Dolly Love
Diana King as Mildred Fanshawe
Charmian May as Miss Marjorie Milton
Georgina Moon as Miss Finch
Johnny Wade as Roger
George Innes as Sergeant Hobble
Peggy Ledger as Katy O'Rourke (series 1-2)

Episodes
31 episodes were broadcast over four series, including two Christmas specials.

Series 1 (1977)

Series 2 (1978)

Series 3 (1979)

Christmas specials (1979 and 1980)

Series 4 (1981)

DVD release
Network released each series individually; a complete four-disc set was released on 5 February 2018.

References

External links

1977 British television series debuts
1981 British television series endings
1970s British sitcoms
1980s British sitcoms
English-language television shows
ITV sitcoms
Television series about old age
Television series by ITV Studios
Television series by Yorkshire Television